Commoris is a genus of Caribbean jumping spiders that was first described by Eugène Louis Simon in 1902.  it contains only two species, found only in Dominica and on Guadeloupe: C. enoplognatha and C. minor.

References

Salticidae genera
Salticidae
Spiders of the Caribbean